The O Street Viaduct was located in the South Omaha, Nebraska. Built to accommodate O Street traversing over the Union Pacific tracks, the overpass was constructed in 1885 by interests associated with the Omaha Stockyards. It was included on the Bridges in Nebraska Multiple Property Submission on June 29, 1992. The bridge was demolished in 2001 as part of the redevelopment of the stockyards.

See also
 Transportation in Omaha
 History of Omaha

References

 

Buildings and structures demolished in 2001
Historic bridges in Omaha, Nebraska
Former buildings and structures in Omaha, Nebraska
Demolished bridges in the United States
Demolished buildings and structures in Omaha, Nebraska
Road bridges in Nebraska
Viaducts in the United States